Bira Kishore Ray (21 October 1891 – 26 July 1958) was an Indian judge who was the first Chief Justice of Orissa High Court.

Early years
Ray was born on 21 October 1891, in Bagalgarh village of Cuttack district/

Legal career 
Ray was the first Advocate General of Orissa Province. Later he was elevated to the Bench of Patna High Court in 1945. He was also the first Odia to become the Judge of Patna High Court.

Ray was married to Latika. He died on 26 July 1958, the 10th anniversary of the Orissa High Court.

References

External links
 Orissa High Court

1891 births
1958 deaths
20th-century Indian judges
Chief Justices of the Orissa High Court
Judges of the Patna High Court
People from Cuttack district